Rukiye Sultan ( "charm";11 October 1906  20 February 1927) was an Ottoman princess, the daughter of Şehzade Mehmed Ziyaeddin, son of Mehmed V.

Early life
Rukiye Sultan was born on 11 October 1906 in the Dolmabahçe Palace. Her father was Şehzade Mehmed Ziyaeddin, son of Sultan Mehmed V and Kamures Kadın, and her mother was Ünsiyar Hanım. She was the third child and daughter of her father and the second child of her mother. She had a sister, Dürriye Sultan, one year elder then her, and a brother Şehzade Mehmed Nazım, four years younger than her.

In 1915, she began her education with her sister and brother. Their teacher was Safiye Ünüvar, who taught them the Quran. In 1918, after the death of her grandfather, she moved to her father's villa located at Haydarpasha, she occupied the first floor with her mother and sister.

Marriage
In 1922, the empire was abolished and on 29 October 1923, Turkey was officially declared as a republic, after which the imperial family went into exile in March 1924. Rukiye and her family settled in Beirut, Lebanon. Here she met Abdülbaki Ihsan Bey, a descendant of Sokollu Mehmed Pasha through his son Sultanzade Ibrahim Paşah by Ismihan Sultan (daughter of Sultan Selim II and Nurbanu Sultan). He had taken part in the Turkish War of Independence, and had been stripped from his nationality, and was forbidden from returning to Turkey. The two married in 1924, and their only daughter, Behiye Emel Nuricihan Hanımsultan was born on 15 June 1925. Six months later after the birth, Rukiye became ill. They then went to Budapest, Hungary for treatment.

Death
Rukiye Sultan died on 20 February 1927 at the age of twenty, in Budapest, Hungary and was buried in the tomb of sixteenth century, Ottoman Sufi, Gül Baba.

Issue

Ancestry

References

Sources
 

20th-century Ottoman princesses
Royalty from Istanbul
1906 births
1927 deaths